The Roman Catholic Archdiocese of Conakry is the Metropolitan See for the Ecclesiastical province of Conakry, which covers all Guinea. It is of Latin Rite and depends on the  Congregation for the Evangelization of Peoples.

The Archbishop's is the Cathédrale Sainte-Marie, in the national capital Conakry.

Statistics 
As per 2014, it pastorally served 130,152 Catholics (2.8% of 4,681,000 total) on 116,572 km² in 35 parishes and one mission with 64 priests (48 diocesan, 16 religious), 102 lay religious (36 brothers, 66 sisters) and 18 seminarians.

Ecclesiastical province 
All other dioceses in Guinea are suffragan sees of Conakry:
 Roman Catholic Diocese of Kankan
 Roman Catholic Diocese of N’Zérékoré

History 
On 18 October 1897, the Apostolic Prefecture of French Guinea was established on French colonial territories canonically split off from the Apostolic Vicariate of Senegambia (based in Senegal) and the Apostolic Vicariate of Sierra Leone (in Sierra Leone).

On 18 April 1920, it became the Apostolic Vicariate of French Guinea.
 
On 12 May 1949, it was renamed the Apostolic Vicariate of Conakry, having lost territory to establish the Apostolic Prefecture of Kankan, now one of its suffragan dioceses.

On 14 September 1955, was elevated to a residential see, named the Metropolitan Archdiocese of Conakry.

It enjoyed a Papal visit by Pope John Paul II in February 1992.

Ordinaries 

 Prefect Apostolic of French Guinea  
 Raymond-René Lerouge, Holy Ghost Fathers (C.S.Sp.) (9 March 1911 – 22 April 1920 see below)

  Vicar Apostolic of French Guinea  
 Raymond-René Lerouge, C.S.Sp. (see above 22 April 1920 – 12 May 1949 see below), Titular Bishop of Selge (18 April 1920 – death 2 July 1949)

  Vicars Apostolic of Conakry  
 Raymond-René Lerouge, C.S.Sp. (see above 12 May 1949 – death 2 July 1949)
 Michel-Jules-Joseph-Marie Bernard, C.S.Sp.(12 March 1950 – 18 July 1954), Titular Bishop of Ægeæ (12 March 1950 – 14 September); later  Vicar Apostolic of Brazzaville (Congo-Brazzaville) (18 July 1954 – 14 September 1955), promoted first Metropolitan  Archbishop of Brazzaville (14 September 1955 – 2 May 1964), later Titular Archbishop of Aræ in Mauretania (2 May 1964 – 15 January 1966), Archbishop-Bishop of Nouakchott (Mauritania) (15 January 1966 – 21 December 1973)
 Gérard-Paul-Louis-Marie de Milleville, C.S.Sp. (8 May 1955 – 14 September 1955 see below), Titular Bishop of Dalisandus in Pamphylia (8 May 1955 – 14 September 1955) Metropolitan Archbishops of Conakry 
 Gérard-Paul-Louis-Marie de Milleville, C.S.Sp. (see above'' 14 September 1955 – 10 March 1962), also Apostolic Administrator of Kankan (Guinea) (1957 – 14 December 1958); later Titular Archbishop of Gabala (10 March 1962 – death 12 January 2007) as Auxiliary Bishop of Fortaleza (Brazil) (1967 – 1984), Apostolic Administrator of Basse-Terre (Guadeloupe, French) (29 January 1968 – 5 October 1970)
 Raymond-Maria Tchidimbo, C.S.Sp. (10 March 1962 – retired 13 August 1979), President of Episcopal Conference of the Guinea (1970 – 1979); died 2011.
 Robert Sarah (13 August 1979 – 1 October 2001), appointed Secretary of the Congregation for the Evangelization of Peoples (elevated to Cardinal in 2010)
 Vincent Coulibaly (6 May 2003 to date)

See also 
 Roman Catholicism in Guinea
 List of Roman Catholic dioceses in Guinea

Sources and external links 
 GCatholic.org, with Google satellite photo

Roman Catholic dioceses in Guinea
1897 establishments in the French colonial empire
Roman Catholic bishops of Conakry